Pyrausta orphisalis, the orange mint moth or orange-spotted pyrausta, is a species of moth of the family Crambidae. It was described by Francis Walker in 1859. It is found in North America from Newfoundland west to British Columbia, south to Florida and New Mexico.

The wingspan is about 15-17 mm. The moth flies from mid June to late July depending on the location.

The larvae feed on various mint species, including Monarda.

References

orphisalis
Moths of North America
Moths described in 1859